Saint Luke's North Hospital-Smithville Campus is located at 601 South 169 Highway in Smithville, Missouri. It is the Northland area's first hospital and is a 92-bed facility.

History
Smithville Campus was established in 1938 and is located in Smithville, Missouri. The hospital includes Saint Luke's Primary Care–Smithville, a family medicine clinic, an inpatient rehabilitation unit, and an inpatient mental health unit.

External links
 Official Website

Hospitals in Missouri
Hospitals established in 1938
1938 establishments in Missouri